Crow Middle/High School is a public middle/high school in Crow, Oregon, near Eugene, Oregon, United States.

Academics
In 2008, 85% of the school's seniors received a high school diploma. Of 26 students, 22 graduated, two dropped out, and two were still in high school the following year.

References

High schools in Lane County, Oregon
Public high schools in Oregon
Public middle schools in Oregon